Ēriks Pelcis (born 25 June 1978) is a Latvian former footballer. He played for FC Seoul of the South Korean K-League, then known as Anyang LG Cheetahs.

References

 
 

Latvian footballers
1978 births
Living people
Footballers from Riga
Latvia international footballers
K League 1 players
FC Seoul players
FK Jelgava players
Latvian expatriate footballers
Expatriate footballers in Lithuania
Expatriate footballers in South Korea
Expatriate footballers in Russia
FC Anzhi Makhachkala players
Russian Premier League players
Latvian expatriate sportspeople in Russia
Dinaburg FC players
FK Žalgiris players
Association football forwards